Streets Is Watching is the soundtrack album to Abdul Malik Abbott's 1998 film of the same name. It was released on May 12, 1998 via Roc-A-Fella Records/Def Jam Recordings. Production was handled by Mahogany, Jaz-O, AK47, Darrel 'Digga' Branch, Dave G, Dinky Bingham, DJ Clue?, Irv Gotti, Ken "Duro" Ifill, M.O.P., Tone Capone, Ty Fyffe, and Dame Dash, who also served as one of executive producers together with Jay-Z and Kareem "Biggs" Burke. It features appearances from Jay-Z, Christión, Memphis Bleek, Diamonds In Da Rough, DMX, Ja Rule, M.O.P., N.O.R.E., Rell, Sauce Money, Usual Suspects, and The Ranjahz mamber Wais. The album fared well commercially reaching #27 on the Billboard 200 and #3 on the Top R&B/Hip-Hop Albums chart and having two singles ("It's Alright" and "Love For Free") appear on the Billboard Hot 100.

Track listing

Notes
"Celebration" is edited on the explicit version of the album.

Charts

Weekly charts

Year-end charts

References

External links

1998 soundtrack albums
Albums produced by DJ Clue?
Albums produced by Irv Gotti
Albums produced by Ty Fyffe
Albums produced by Jaz-O
Def Jam Recordings soundtracks
Musical film soundtracks
Hip hop soundtracks
Jay-Z albums
Roc-A-Fella Records soundtracks